David Thomas King  (born June 22, 1946) is a Canadian politician and public education policy activist.  He is a former Progressive Conservative Member of the Legislative Assembly of Alberta from August, 1971 to April, 1986, during which time he was Legislative Secretary to (then) Premier Peter Lougheed (1971–1976), Minister of Education (1979–1986), and Minister of Technology, Research, and Telecommunications (1986). As a Member of the Legislative Assembly, King introduced a Bill to repeal the Sexual Sterilization Act stating that the "Act violates fundamental human rights".

In the 1986 general election he was defeated by future Alberta New Democratic Party leader Pam Barrett. In 1992, King ran unsuccessfully for leadership of the Alberta Progressive Conservatives. From  February, 1990 until July, 2010 he served as Executive Director of the Public School Boards' Association of Alberta.  In 2010 King was recognized by the Alberta Teachers' Association and the Canadian Teachers' Federation for his years of service to education, noting that as Minister of Education, he was responsible for major initiatives, including the computer technology in schools program, the teacher internship program and the designated community schools program.

David is now active with the Green Party of B.C., serving on the Provincial Council. He served as one of the two provincial campaign co-chairs for the 2013 BC provincial election for the Green Party of British Columbia

References

External links 
 "History of the Public School Boards' Association of Alberta" By the Public School Boards' Association of Alberta mentions king as first Executive Director.
 "The Controversial Eighties" by the Alberta Teachers' Association.  Article discusses (from the ATA's point of view) some changes brought about by King, while he was Minister of Education.
 "A BRIEF HISTORY OF THE COUNCIL ON ALBERTA TEACHING STANDARDS" by the Council on Alberta Teaching Standards.  In 1985 King, as Minister of Education, eliminated the Board of Teacher Education and Certification (BTEC) and set-up the Council on Alberta Teaching Standards in its place.
 "Play Dough's Res Publica: Democracy, Community and Public School Education" - By David King

1946 births
Living people
People from Perth, Ontario
University of Alberta alumni
Progressive Conservative Association of Alberta MLAs
Members of the Executive Council of Alberta
Education ministers of Alberta